The Halcón H1 is a light-sport aircraft (LSA) developed and manufactured in Mexico by Horizontec, the Universidad Aeronáutica de Querétaro (UNAQ) and the Centro Nacional de Tecnología Aeronáuticas (CENTA).

Design and development 
The design was conceived in Italy by Giovani Angelucci, who later moved to Mexico City to create the first prototype, and the company Horizontec was born in 2014. In 2015 CONACYT and the Ministry of Economy granted financial support for 5 million pesos (around $312,000 US dollars) to support the project, which would be incubated a year later by CENTA and UNAQ.

The first prototype was built with aircraft grade wood, fiberglass, epoxy resin and other light materials, it included a 100 horsepower Rotax 912 ULS engine and its first flight was made on September 30, 2017.

Its seating configuration is side by side, with fixed tricycle landing gear. The aircraft is designed to carry out tasks such as surveillance, reconnaissance, exhibition, research and development. In 2016 SEDENA presented the model of a military trainer plane called "Proyecto Azteca A01", which received strong criticism for its similarities with the Halcón H1.

The Halcón H1 will be used as the basis for the development of the Horizontec Halcón H2, which will be assembled in composite materials by IK Aerospace, it will have a 141-horsepower Rotax 915 iS engine and Garmin 3GX avionics.

Accidents and incidents 
 On April 15, 2021, a Halcón H1 aircraft with registration XB-PMZ that was conducting touch and go landings at Querétaro Airport had to make a forced landing in the Municipality of Colón, severely damaging the aircraft and leaving its two crew members injured.

Specifications

References

External links
 IK Aerospace
 Horizontec

Experimental aircraft
Mexican civil aircraft
Light-sport aircraft
Single-engined pusher aircraft